Plášilite is a very rare uranium mineral with the formula Na2(UO2)(SO4)2•3H2O. Chemically related minerals include natrozippeite, belakovskiite, meisserite, fermiite and oppenheimerite. Most of these uranyl sulfate minerals were originally found in the Blue Lizard mine, San Juan County, Utah, US. The mineral is named after Czech crystallographer Jakub Plášil.

Association and origin
Plášilite is associated with other sulfate minerals: natrozippeite, johannite, blödite, brochantite, chalcanthite, gypsum, hexahydrite, manganoblödite, and tamarugite. Non-sulfate coexisting minerals include atacamite, calcite, dickite and gerhardtite. Plášilite is secondary in origin, being the product of weathering of the primary uranium mineral, uraninite.

Crystal structure
The crystal structure of plášilite is of a new type. Its building blocks are:
 (UO2)2(SO4)2(OH)2 sheets, with a charge 2-, parallel to (010), of a phosphuranylite topology
 edge-sharing NaO2(H2O)4 polyhedra, parallel to [001]
The sodium-bearing polyhedra link the uranyl-sulfate sheets. It terms of sheet geometry, crystal structure of plášilite is similar to that of deliensite.

References

Uranium(VI) minerals
Sulfate minerals
Sodium minerals
Monoclinic minerals
Minerals in space group 14